WWE Studios Inc. (formerly known as WWE Films) is an American film studio owned by the professional wrestling promotion WWE. WWE Studios movies frequently mix well-known actors and actresses in lead roles with WWE wrestlers, and teams with existing production and distribution companies to deliver the product at a cheaper cost for both parties.

History
Before the formation of WWE Studios, the WWF had produced the 1989 film No Holds Barred featuring Hulk Hogan under the Shane Distribution Company banner, a precursor to today's company. WWE Studios released the film on DVD in 2012.

WWE Studios was formed in 2002 as WWE Films, and was seen as "a natural extension of the entertainment business" that they already featured in the weekly Raw and SmackDown television programs. Joel Simon was named as President of the WWE Films and Jed Blaugrund as vice president.

WWE announced the first three film projects in January 2005; The Condemned, starring Steve Austin, The Marine, starring John Cena, and Goodnight, later retitled as See No Evil, starring Kane. Both of these independent film projects were genre films that cost $20 million to star his wrestlers.

In 2008, the name was changed to WWE Studios. On February 25, 2008, WWE had signed a deal with 20th Century Fox Home Entertainment that Fox received to WWE that they would get one theatrical film and four straight-to-DVD movies. The move was designed to expand into production of scripted television series and films for networks.

In February 2009, WWE Studios announced the first film which would not feature a WWE wrestler as the lead, with That's What I Am starring Ed Harris as a schoolteacher accused of fondling kids. In December 2009, it was announced that Patricia Clarkson and Danny Glover would star in the WWE Studios and Samuel Goldwyn Films co-production of Legendary along with WWE wrestler John Cena. Around the same time, the film announced production had been completed on another co-production with Samuel Goldwyn Films, the comedy Knucklehead, which starred WWE wrestler Big Show. Further projects were announced in 2010 with WWE wrestlers in lead roles, with The Chaperone starring Triple H, which was released in February 2011, and Bending the Rules starring Edge, which was released in March 2012. These initial releases were largely unsuccessful financially.

In February 2012, WWE Studios agreed to a new three-film deal with 20th Century Fox Home Entertainment to produce, finance and market three straight-to-DVD titles, including The Marine 3: Homefront starring The Miz, having previously worked with 20th Century Fox Home Entertainment on the previous films in the franchise, The Marine and The Marine 2. The deal also included the release of 12 Rounds 2: Reloaded starring Randy Orton, having together previously released 12 Rounds starring John Cena. Also that year, WWE Studios had signed a deal with Lionsgate in order to work on upcoming projects, most notably a Leprechaun project via a two-picture deal between the two studios.

In April 2012, WWE Studios partnered with Warner Bros. Entertainment France and producer Thomas Langmann to distribute French film Les Reines Du Ring in the United States and Canada, as well as the rights to remake the film, which was announced in 2014.

WWE Studios also produced No One Lives with Pathe Pictures, starring Luke Evans and WWE wrestler Brodus Clay, and acquired the 2011 Toronto International Film Festival cult hit The Day, starring Shawn Ashmore and Dominic Monaghan. WWE Studios has also acquired Interrogation, a suspense thriller by Adam Rodin. WWE Studios then secured the rights to Bermuda, a found footage horror spec script by Bobby Lee Darby and Nathan Brookes, set in the Bermuda Triangle. WWE Studios further announced a partnership with producer Edward R. Pressman and Jason Blum's Blum-Hanson-Allen films to develop Cruisin' for a Brusin''', an action comedy to be written and directed by Adam Bhala Lough. WWE Studios and Warner Bros. co-produced a Scooby-Doo animated feature that found Scooby and the gang solving a mystery at WrestleMania, which also starred an ensemble of WWE Superstars. The movie released on March 25, 2014. On May 29, 2013, it was announced that WWE studios and Warner Bros would again team up to co-produce a Flintstones animated movie to be released in early 2015.

WWE Studios most successful film to date is the 2013 release The Call, starring Halle Berry and Abigail Breslin, which made close to $70 million at the box office, despite a comparatively small budget of just $13m. The film opened at the US box office at No. 2 with 17 million in its first weekend. It was further reported that WWE was looking at a potential sequel following the success of The Call.

In 2013, WWE Studios and Hyde Park Entertainment announced a deal to work together on the film adaptation of the 1980s television series The Fall Guy. The film will star Dwayne Johnson, who made his name as The Rock in WWE from 1996 to 2004 before becoming an actor, in his second WWE Studios production, with the first being The Scorpion King. In August 2014, a second collaboration between WWE Studios and Hyde Park was announced, with Ken Jeong, David Hasselhoff and WWE Hall of Famer Hulk Hogan signed to star in a comedy Killing Hasselhoff.

In February 2014, WWE announced the sequel to the 1996 film Jingle All the Way, to star Larry the Cable Guy and WWE wrestler Santino Marella.

In May 2014, it was announced that WWE had extended their partnership with Lionsgate Entertainment to release a further six films together, with the first two announced as Vendetta, starring The Big Show and 12 Rounds 3: Lockdown starring Dean Ambrose. These group of six films have been referred as the Action Six-Pack Series.

In November 2014, WWE announced a new partnership deal with Warner Bros. Home Entertainment. In March 2015, they announced a partnership with newly founded Gene Simmons production company Erebus Pictures and in April 2015, WWE Studios teamed with British company Richwater Films to co-produce and co-finance action-thrillers Eliminators and Rampage.

In November 2017, WWE announced that WWE Studios will expand its mandate to include scripted, non-scripted, family, and animated television and digital content.

In February 2019, it was reported that WWE Studios and Netflix came to an agreement that would see WWE Studios produce new family-friendly movies for Netflix's platform.

In July 2019, it was announced that WWE Studios will be producing its first television show, Fight Like A Girl, for Quibi. It would later be moved to The Roku Channel following the closure of Quibi.

In March 2021, the Game Show Network revealed at their upfront; they signed a deal with WWE Studios to develop shows hosted by WWE talent.

In March 2022, A&E Network and WWE expanded their agreement for more episodes of Biography: WWE Legends and WWE's Most Wanted Treasure. It was also announced a new series called WWE Rivals''. The deal between the company calls for additional content to be announced at a later date.

Filmography

Film

Television

Digital

Series

Streaming

Film

Series

Notes

References

External links
WWE Studios at WWE.com

Film production companies of the United States
Film distributors of the United States
WWE
Mass media companies established in 2002
2002 establishments in California
Companies based in Los Angeles